Turcarra is a townland of 339 acres in County Armagh, Northern Ireland. It is situated in the civil parish of Loughgall and the historic barony of Oneilland West.

Castle Dillon House, a Grade B+ listed building, is in the townland.

See also
List of townlands in County Armagh

References

Townlands of County Armagh
Civil parish of Loughgall